Airedale International Air Conditioning based in Leeds, West Yorkshire, England is a British manufacturer and worldwide distributor of cooling, heating and HVAC systems.

Alongside its Leeds headquarters, Airedale has manufacturing facilities in South Africa and the United States, exporting to 60 countries worldwide. Airedale is part of the Modine group of companies, based in Wisconsin, United States, which employs approximately 6,400 people at 30 facilities in 16 countries.

History
1974 – Formed by two Leeds based entrepreneurs Alan Duttine and Peter Midgley who recognised the opportunity for air conditioning for specialist computer and healthcare environments at the dawn of a new technological era. Alan and Peter who both worked for Calverley based Thermatank barely knew each other, but met by chance, at Leeds Bradford Airport when their flights were delayed. The two got talking and decided to set up Airedale Air Conditioning in June 1974. Airedale Air Conditioning manufactures its first precision air conditioning unit and condenser unit, the VA5 and CU5.

1976 – Airedale exports to its first overseas client in the Netherlands. The business relocates to Clayton Wood Rise on the Leeds Ring Road – the building is still known as Airedale House.

1979 – Airedale moves to Park Mills, Rawdon, West Yorkshire.

1982 – In May 1982, Airedale Air Conditioning changed its name to Airedale International Air Conditioning Ltd. to reflect its growing export business. AIAC South Africa was formed in Johannesburg to manufacture precision air conditioning systems.

1984 – First UK manufacturer to develop a water cooling industrial chiller the ACC.

1994 – First manufacturer to use R407C refrigerant in both chillers and precision air conditioning units.

2003 – First precision air conditioning manufacturer in Europe to introduce electronic expansion valves to their product.

2005 – Airedale bought by US firm Modine, Alan Duttine retires after 39 years and was recognised with an OBE for his services to the industry.

2009 – Airedale launches first IT cooling system the OnRak™.

2010 – First to develop a concurrent free cooling chiller with centrifugal compressor, the TurboChill FreeCool.

2011 – First to apply microchannel heat exchangers, concurrent free cooling and centrifugal compressors in the same chiller system - the DeltaChill.

2013 – First UK manufacturer to develop a chiller incorporating the low global-warming potential (GWP) refrigerant R1234ze to hold British Standards Institution approval - the TurboChill. Airedale opens an operations hub in Moscow, Russia.

2014 – Airedale acquires Barkell Ltd., a UK leader in Air Handling Units. Airedale opens an operations hub in Dubai, United Arab Emirates.

2016 – Her Royal Highness The Princess Royal officially opens Airedale International’s new headquarters and manufacturing facility in Rawdon, Leeds, during a visit on 10 May 2016.

Acquisition by Modine Manufacturing Company
Airedale was privately owned until 2005 when it was acquired by US owned Modine Manufacturing Company. Modine, with 2014 fiscal revenues of $1.5 billion, specialises in air conditioning. Modine's products are used in light, medium and heavy-duty vehicles, heating, ventilation and air conditioning equipment (HVAC), off-highway, industrial equipment and refrigeration systems.

Factory fire
On 6 September 2013, Airedale suffered a fire at its premises in Rawdon, West Yorkshire, Leeds. The factory was badly damaged; as a result the company relocated to temporary premises on the outskirts of Leeds city centre whilst rebuilding work progressed on the existing site. Airedale moved back to the new redeveloped facility on 4 January 2016

Acquisition of Barkell Ltd.
 
In a statement to the New York Stock Exchange on 28 February 2014, Airedale International's parent company, Modine Manufacturing Company, announced it had completed the acquisition of Consett-based manufacturer of custom-built air handling units, Barkell Ltd. The acquisition allowed Airedale to extend its product portfolio to include a range of air handling Units (AHUs) which offer data centres, offices and industrial facilities a cooling system which uses indirect fresh air as the primary cooling medium.

Manufacturing locations & offices
Alongside its UK operations in Leeds, West Yorkshire, Airedale has manufacturing facilities in South Africa and the United States. Airedale is the only manufacturer of precision air conditioning systems in Africa. In November 2013, Airedale opened an operations hub in Moscow and in the Dubai Airport Freezone in February 2014.

Products
Airedale has a number of products over five air conditioning product ranges. These ranges including Precision Air Conditioning, IT cooling, Chillers, Comfort cooling, Condensers & Condensing Units and Air Handling Units.

Airedale’s business derives mainly from the data centre market, other markets include process cooling, telecommunications, commercial air conditioning and laboratory cooling.

Airedale also provides building management systems and controls design and integration, service, maintenance, spare parts and offers air conditioning and refrigeration courses through its on-site training school. A special projects team manages large-scale, complex upgrade programmes for key customers including the country’s major telecoms providers.

References

Heating, ventilation, and air conditioning companies
Manufacturing companies based in Leeds
Manufacturing companies established in 1974
1974 establishments in England